Alana Valentine is an Australian playwright, dramatist, librettist and Director working in theatre, film, opera and television. As a playwright, she won the Helpmann Award. Valentine first worked with Vicki Gordon Music Productions to create the First Nations show Barefoot Divas, Walk a Mile in My Shoes. The work premiered at the Sydney Festival in 2012 and the Wellington International Arts Festival in 2013 touring the USA and Canada in 2014 before selling out the Hong Kong International Arts Festival in 2015. In 2016 Gordon commissioned Valentine and Ursula Yovich to co-write the First Nations rock musical Barbara and the Camp Dogs presented on stage in December 2017 at Belvoir in Sydney and touring nationally in 2019. The work was critically acclaimed winning best Original Score and Best Musical in the 2019 Helpmann Awards and four Green Room Awards (2020) for Best Writing, Best Music Composition, Best Production and Best Performance. The screen adaptation is currently in development as a major International feature film. 

Valentine is also working with Jungle Entertainment with her feature film OFFSET, and has an option offer for the screen version of her latest play WAYSIDE BRIDE, presented at Belvoir in April 2022. In 2019 Valentine received development funding from SBS TV to work with Blake Ayshford and Alice Addison on a TV series Lady Chaplain, produced by Easy Tiger, and was the Associate Producer on Lindy Chamberlain: The True Story for Easy Tiger and Channel 10. She has written for McLeod’s Daughters and her short films are Mother Love (for SBS TV), The Witnesses (for the Museum of Sydney), and Reef Dreaming, a water screen installation in Sydney's Darling Harbor. 

In 2022 Valentine was commissioned by opera and theatre director Neil Armfield to write an oratorio WATERSHED: The Death of Dr Duncan with Christos Tsiolkas, composed by Joseph Twist. The work was presented to critical acclaim at the 2022 Adelaide Festival. Valentine has collaborated as a co-writer and dramaturg with First Nations director and choreographer Stephen Page for the past eleven years on his award-winning dance theatre productions for Bangarra, including the stage presentation of DUBBOO: Life of a Songman (2018) Patyegarang (2014) Helpmann Award winning Bennelong (2017) Dark Emu (2018) ID from Belong (2011) and most recently the highly successful First Nations opera WUDJANG: Not the Past (2022).

AWARDS : Valentine was the 2021 co-recipient of the UTS Chancellor’s Award for excellence in recognition of her accomplished work and the consistent excellence of her dramatic output. She has been awarded four Australian  Writers Guild awards and a Churchill Fellowship. She has also received a Centenary Medal for her work on the Centenary of Federation, a Cultural Leadership Grant from the Australia Council for the Arts and a Literature Fund Fellowship. Valentine has had several plays produced overseas and received 21 grants and awards, including a Churchill Fellowship, the Queensland Premier's award for Run Rabbit Run; and an international fellowship from London's Globe Theatre. She holds a Graduate Diploma in Museum Studies from the University of Sydney (2000).

Works

Plays 

Swimming The Globe''' (1996).  A play about the parallel paths of two teen-age swimmers from different parts of the world who both strive to compete in the Olympics.  It was first performed at the Mission Theatre in Newcastle, NSW, on 21 August 1996.  It was commissioned by Freewheels Theatre Company, with the two girls played by Louise Chapman as Igorina and Kathryn Hume as Stace. It was also published as a performing arts book in 1999 by Currency Press.The Conjurers (1997)Run Rabbit Run (2004) about the South Sydney Rabbitohs, ae Rugby league club, on the HSC Drama syllabus in NSW(7 January 2004). Bunny boiler, Sydney Morning HeraldCovenant (2006)Parramatta girls (2007) about the Girls Training School, Parramatta. Produced at the Belvoir St Theatre. The play is on the HSC Drama syllabus in New South Wales. It is written as  "a dramatisation of interviews with a number of women who served time in Australia’s most notorious girls detention centre"Singing the lonely heart' is a one-act play is loosely based on the life of Carson McCullers. It was published together with Ozone in 2008.Ozone  is a surreal fantasy.Shafana and Aunt Sarrinah: Soft Revolution  (2010) The play, performed at the Seymour Centre Sydney, 6–29 August 2009, is about "how Islamic women think and feel about" wearing the hijab. It was "commissioned by The Alex Buzo Company to 'respond' to Alex Buzo's play Norm and Ahmed"MP (2011)Cormack, Bridget (13 September 2011). Interviews with MPs inform state of play, The AustralianDead Man Brake (2013) about the Waterfall rail accident. Produced by Merrigong Theatre Company.Barbara and the Camp Dogs (2017), co-written with Ursula Yovich. Produced by Belvoir.The Sugar House (2018), generational play set in a CSR warehouse in Pyrmont.  Produced by Belvoir.Wayside Bride (2021) Produced by Belvoir (2022-04-02 to 2022-05-29).Wudjang not the past (2022) Bangarra Dance Theatre
 Watershed (2022) - The Death of Dr Duncan. Adelaide Festival. State Opera South Australia  

 Books 

 Bowerbird - the Art of Making Theatre Drawn from Life, 

Awards
2007 Nomination for 2007 Helpmann Awards for Best New Australian Work and Best Play for Parramatta GirlsAlana Valentine - Biography , RGM Artist Group, Retrieved March 2012
2004 Queensland Premier's Literary Awards, Best Drama Script
2003 NSW Writer's Fellowship
2002 Rodney Seaborn Playwright's Award
2002 International Writing Fellowship at Shakespeare's Globe Theatre in London. 
2016 Head Full of Love play [Queensland Theatre production] PAC Australia Drovers Award for Tour of the Year
2018 NSW Premier's Literary Awards, Nick Enright Prize for Playwriting, shortlisted for Barbara and the Camp Dogs'' (with Ursula Yovich).

References

External links
Author's web site
Author's page at rgm literary

Australian dramatists and playwrights
Living people
1961 births